The 1980–81 Divizia C was the 25th season of Liga III, the third tier of the Romanian football league system.

Team changes

To Divizia C
Relegated from Divizia B
 Muscelul Câmpulung
 Energia Slatina
 Unirea Alba Iulia
 ICIM Brașov
 Carpați Mârșa
 Industria Sârmei Câmpia Turzii
 Energia Gheorghiu-Dej
 Chimia Turnu Magurele
 Someșul Satu Mare
 Portul Constanța
 FCM Giurgiu
 Strungul Arad

Promoted from County Championship
 Unirea Siret
 Tepro Iași
 Victoria IRA Bacău
 FEPA 74 Bârlad
 Avântul Matca
 Tractorul Viziru
 Constructorul Călărași
 Viitorul Mahmudia
 Cetatea Turnu Măgurele
 ICIM Ploiești
 Unirea Răcari
 Mecanizatorul Șimian
 Victoria Craiova
 Șoimii Lipova
 CFR Caransebeș
 Unirea Valea lui Mihai
 Rapid Jibou
 Electrozahăr Târgu Mureș
 Minerul Paroșeni
 Textila Năsăud
 Minerul Baia Borșa
 Metalul Mangalia 
 Hidroenergia Râmnicu Vâlcea
 Constructorul Sfântu Gheorghe

From Divizia C
Promoted to Divizia B
 Ceahlăul Piatra Neamț
 Borzești
 CSU Galați
 IMU Medgidia
 Sirena București
 ROVA Roșiori
 Minerul Lupeni
 CFR Timișoara
 Rapid Arad
 CIL Sighetu Marmației
 Metalul Aiud
 Oltul Sfântu Gheorghe

Relegated to County Championship
 IM Piatra-Neamț
 Danubiana Roman
 Constructorul Vaslui
 ASA Iași
 Chimia Buzău
 FNC Săhăteni
 Granitul Babadag
 Automecanica București
 Vâscoza București
 Dinamo Alexandria
 Constructorul Pitești
 Chimistul Râmnicu Vâlcea
 Gloria Strehaia
 Laminorul Nădrag
 Știința Petroșani
 Minerul Șuncuiuș
 Unirea Oradea
 Bradul Vișeu de Sus
 Hebe Sângeorz-Băi
 Sticla Târnaveni
 Faianța Sighișoara
 Carpați Covasna
 Utilajul Făgăraș

Renamed teams 
Dinamo CPL Focșani was renamed as Gloria Focșani.

Pescărușul Tulcea was renamed as Șantierul Naval Tulcea.

Unirea Știința Eforie Nord was renamed as Unirea Eforie Nord.

Metalul Rovinari was renamed as Jiul Rovinari.

Hidroenergia Râmnicu Vâlcea was renamed as Minerul Râmnicu Vâlcea.

Șoimii Lipova was renamed as Șoimii Strungul Lipova.

Other changes 
Chimia Brăila took the place of Progresul Brăila in Divizia B due to the merger between FC Brăila and Progresul Brăila

Dacia Unirea Brăila was spared from relegation.

Explorări Deva and Minerul Deva merged, the first one being absorbed by the second one and was renamed as Explormin Deva.

Minerul Certej took the place of Explorări Deva in Divizia C due to the merger between Explorări and Minerul Deva.

Știința Petroșani and Minerul Vulcan merged, the first one being absorbed by the second one and was renamed as Minerul Știința Vulcan.

IPA Sibiu was renamed during the winter break as Textila IPA Sibiu and moved to Cisnădie.

League tables

Seria I

Seria II

Seria III

Seria IV

Seria V

Seria VI

Seria VII

Seria VIII

Seria IX

Seria X

Seria XI

Seria XII

See also 
 1980–81 Divizia A
 1980–81 Divizia B
 1980–81 County Championship

References 

Liga III seasons
3
Romania